Eveline Safir Lavalette was an Algerian Pied-Noir revolutionary and activist during the Algerian War of Independence. She was born in 1927 in Rouïba. In 1951, she became active in the Algerian Youth Association for Social Action, and became an anti-poverty crusader. She joined the National Liberation Front (Algeria) as an officer, distributing pamphlets and assisting with the publication of the Front's underground newspaper, El Moudjahid. She was arrested by the French colonial forces in 1956, and imprisoned and tortured until 1959, when she was released.

She was elected to the National Assembly in 1964, and played a major role in the formation of Algeria's education system. In 1967, she married journalist Abdelkader Safir, and in 1968 she joined the Ministry of Labor. In 2013, her autobiography was published; she died in 2014 in Médéa.

References

Algerian revolutionaries
Female revolutionaries
Members of the People's National Assembly
Members of the National Liberation Front (Algeria)